Constantin Ciprian Popa (born July 15, 1980) is a Romanian sprint canoer who has competed since 2005. He won two medals at the ICF Canoe Sprint World Championships with a silver (C-4 1000 m: 2005) and a bronze (C-4 500 m: 2007).

Popa also finished fourth in the C-2 1000 m event at the 2008 Summer Olympics in Beijing.

References

Sports-reference.com profile

1980 births
Canoeists at the 2008 Summer Olympics
Living people
Olympic canoeists of Romania
Romanian male canoeists
ICF Canoe Sprint World Championships medalists in Canadian